Walid Mhadeb El Khatroushi (born 6 November 1985), known as Tofaha (Apple in English), is a Libyan football midfielder.

Career
El-Khatroushi currently plays at the club level for Al-Ittihad.

He is also part of the Libya national football team, and was a member of the Libyan Olympic squad that won the bronze medal in the 2005 Mediterranean Games.

References

External links

1985 births
Living people
Libyan footballers
Association football midfielders
Libya international footballers
Al-Ittihad Club (Tripoli) players
2012 Africa Cup of Nations players
Competitors at the 2005 Mediterranean Games
Mediterranean Games bronze medalists for Libya
Mediterranean Games medalists in football
Libyan Premier League players